Syrets was a Nazi concentration camp established in 1942 in Kyiv's western neighborhood of , part of Kyiv since 1799. The toponym was derived from a local small river. Some 327 inmates of the KZ Syrets (among them 100 Jews) were forced to remove all traces of mass murder at Babi Yar.

Establishment and location 
The concentration camp was established in 1942 at the former summer camp of the Kyiv garrison on the northern edge of the city of Kyiv, a few hundred meters from the Babi Yar ravine, which had been the scene of enormous massacres in late September 1941 and later.  Syrets was intended to be a subsidiary of Sachsenhausen concentration camp in Germany.  About 3,000 people were imprisoned at Syrets, guarded by Ukrainian policemen and German SS. Paul Otto Radomski was the camp commandant.

The camp was intended to house prisoners perceived as opponents of the Nazi regime, mainly Jews. Once a person was arrested, only skilled craftsmen would survive, to be used as forced labor. All others  were shot or murdered by gas van.

Camp operation 
The prisoners (women and men) were housed in wooden barracks and in dug-outs with doors and stairs leading down from the ground level to prevent them from freezing up in winter.  The inmates were underfed and many starved to death, with daily mortality of around 10–15 people. Sturmbannführer Radomski ran a terror regime in the camp with the aid of Kommandant Anton Prokupek and a company of Sotniks. For the smallest misdemeanours he imposed heavy punishments and often struck the prisoners with the whip.

Inmate revolt 
Before the Germans retreated from Kyiv, they attempted to conceal the atrocities they had committed at Babi Yar. Paul Blobel, who was in control of the mass murders in Babi Yar two years earlier, supervised the Sonderaktion 1005 in eliminating its traces. For six weeks from August to September 1943, more than 300 chained prisoners were forced to exhume and burn the corpses (using local headstones as bricks to build ovens) and scattered the ashes on farmland in the vicinity.).

During the Sonderkommando 1005 exhumations, a group of prisoners secretly armed themselves with tools and scraps of metal they managed to find and conceal. They picked locks with keys they found on victims' bodies. Martin Gilbert quotes historian : 

On the night of September 29, 1943, as the camp was being dismantled, an inmate revolt broke out. The prisoners overpowered the guards using their bare hands, hammers and screwdrivers. Fifteen people managed to escape. Among them was Vladimir Davіdov, who later served as a witness at the Nuremberg Trials. Among other escapees were Fyodor Zavertanny, Jacob Kaper, Filip Vilkis, Leonid Kharash, I. Brodskiy, Leonid Kadomskiy, David Budnik, Fyodor Yershov, Jakov Steiuk, Semyon Berland, Vladimir Kotlyar.  Once Nazi control was re-established in the camp, the remaining 311 inmates were executed.

After the camp's liberation, Soviet authorities took a group of American, British, and Soviet correspondents to the site of the Babi Yar massacres. Bill Downs and Bill Lawrence were among those who interviewed three Syrets-held Jewish prisoners of war who had been forced to participate in the mass disposal of bodies: Efim Vilkis, Leonid Ostrovsky, and Vladimir Davidoff. In an article for Newsweek in December 1943, Downs described Vilkis' account of the prisoner escape:

According to Vilkis, some of the prisoners grew ill or went mad from the experience, and Nazi guards killed them as a warning to the rest. Three to five prisoners were shot each day.

Camp for German POWs
When the Red Army liberated Kyiv on November 6, 1943, the camp was converted into an internment camp for German POWs and operated until 1946. The camp was subsequently demolished and in the 1950s and 1960s urban development began in the area, which included an apartment complex and a park. The construction of a dam nearby also saw the ravine filled with industrial pulp. The dam collapsed in 1961, leading to a mudslide with numerous fatalities.

See also

 List of Nazi-German concentration camps
 The Holocaust

Notes 

Nazi concentration camps in Ukraine
History of Kyiv
Jewish resistance during the Holocaust
World War II sites in Ukraine
World War II sites of Nazi Germany
Reichskommissariat Ukraine